Mount New Zealand is a large mountain, 2,890 m, standing immediately northwest of Nash Ridge on the south side of Priestley Glacier, in the Eisenhower Range, Victoria Land. Discovered by the Discovery expedition, 1901–04, which named this mountain in recognition of the generous assistance given the expedition by the Government and people of New Zealand.

Mountains of Victoria Land
Scott Coast